Gavin Aubrey Briant (born 11 April 1969 in Salisbury - now Harare) is a former Zimbabwean international cricketer. Briant was a right-handed batsman and a cover fielder who also occasionally kept wicket. He played one Test match and five One Day Internationals for the Zimbabwe national cricket team in February and March 1993, and was also a member of the team that won the ICC Trophy in 1990. Briant played some second XI cricket for Worcestershire County Cricket Club in 1989, and the following year scored 103 not out for Zimbabwe B against England A. His scores for the full Zimbawbean team were more modest; his top score in both Test cricket and One Day Internationals was 16.

References

1969 births
Living people
Mashonaland cricketers
Zimbabwe Test cricketers
Zimbabwe One Day International cricketers
Zimbabwean cricketers
Cricketers from Harare
White Zimbabwean sportspeople
Wicket-keepers